The 1983–84 Challenge Cup was the 83rd staging of rugby league's oldest knockout competition, the Challenge Cup. Known as the State Express Challenge Cup due to sponsorship by State Express 555, the final was contested by Widnes and Wigan at Wembley. Widnes won the match 19–6.

Preliminary round

First round

Second round

Third round

Semi finals

Final
Widnes were appearing at Wembley for the seventh time in the last ten years, while Wigan were making their first appearance in the final since 1970. Widnes were the winners of a fairly one-sided encounter by a score of 19–6, with Joe Lydon winning the Lance Todd Trophy.

References

External links
Challenge Cup official website 
Challenge Cup 1983/84 results at Rugby League Project

Challenge Cup
Challenge Cup
1984 in Welsh rugby league